Georg Stumme (29 July 1886 – 24 October 1942) was a general in the  of Nazi Germany during the Second World War who briefly commanded the Axis forces at the beginning of the Second Battle of El Alamein, and died during the Defence of Outpost Snipe. He had taken part in the Battle of France, the invasion of Yugoslavia and Operation Barbarossa, the invasion of the Soviet Union. He was a recipient of the Knight's Cross of the Iron Cross, the highest award in the military and paramilitary forces of Nazi Germany during the war.

Second World War
Stumme fought in the First World War and stayed with the  after the war. Stumme became commander of 2nd Light Division, which was formed on 10 November 1938.

After the unit was converted into the 7th Panzer Division on 18 October 1939, he relinquished command of the 7th Panzer Division to Erwin Rommel in 1940, and was appointed as commander of XL.  on 15 February 1940, which became XL Corps (motorized) in September 1940. Shortly thereafter he was awarded the Knight's Cross of the Iron Cross for bravery during the Battle of France.

Stumme was sent to Bulgaria and participated in the attacks on Yugoslavia and Greece. Stumme led the attack of the right flank of the 12th Army. His two divisions drove west separately into Yugoslavia and then wheeled south, meeting at Monastir on 9 April. He then participated in the invasion of Greece.

In Operation Barbarossa Stumme served under Field Marshal Fedor von Bock. Stumme commanded the capture of Mozhaisk.

In June 1942 some German plans were captured by Soviet forces. Hitler blamed Stumme and ordered that he be court-martialled. He was relieved of command on 21 July 1942, was found guilty and was sentenced to five years imprisonment but Bock secured his release. Ulrich von Hassell called it a case of "the grotesque game of tin soldiers which Hitler plays with the generals" in his diary and commented: "Stumme, commanding general of a tank corps, was sentenced to five years' imprisonment because [of the actions of a divisional staff officer]. He was immediately pardoned, with Göring promising him a new command and is now being sent to Africa as a substitute for Rommel. An unmilitary, un-Prussian farce".

Rommel had been relieved due to illness and exhaustion. Stumme arrived on 19 September to be briefed a few days before Rommel departed.

Battle of El Alamein and death
Stumme "faithfully followed the plan left by Rommel" for responding to the expected attack. His letters to his superiors indicate he was not optimistic and agreed with Rommel that the only real prospect of success lay in keeping the enemy wrongfooted with attacks, for which he did not have the resources. Just over a month after his arrival the British began their attack on 23 October with a massive bombardment. Stumme prohibited the use of German artillery ammunition to bombard the British forward assembly areas, where the troops were vulnerable, preferring to keep his limited resources in reserve. Reinhard Stumpf called this "a grave mistake that enabled the British to form up for the attack in relative peace".

Unlike Rommel, Stumme travelled without the protection of an escort and radio car. On 24 October Stumme and Colonel Andreas Büchting, his chief signals officer, drove to the front to review the situation. On the way to the command post, the car came into the open and was attacked. Büchting was killed by a shot in the head. Stumme jumped out of the car and apparently was holding onto the side while the driver drove out of range. He was found dead along the track the next day, with no wound that could be seen. He was known to have high blood pressure and it was thought he had died of a heart attack.

Assessments
Stumme has been described by historian Samuel W. Mitcham as a "competent but pleasure-loving general", who cultivated a convivial relationship with his officers, unlike the hard-driving Rommel. One of his officers, Friedrich von Stauffenberg, said that Stumme created a "congenial" atmosphere while maintaining a "crack, well-officered division". According to Mark M. Boatner,

Rommel had suggested that Heinz Guderian should replace him in North Africa but Guderian was out of favor and his request was refused. Stumme was given the command instead and Rommel had confidence in him as a commander.

Awards

 Knight's Cross of the Iron Cross on 19 July 1940 as General der Kavallerie and commanding general of the XXXX. Armeekorps.

References

Citations

Bibliography

 
 
 

1886 births
1942 deaths
German Army  personnel of World War I
German Army personnel killed in World War II
Recipients of the clasp to the Iron Cross, 1st class
Generals of Panzer Troops
Recipients of the Knight's Cross of the Iron Cross
Reichswehr personnel
People from Halberstadt
People from Saxony-Anhalt